Sara Agrež (born 9 December 2000) is a Slovenian footballer who plays as a defender for VfL Wolfsburg and has appeared for the Slovenia women's national team.

Club career
In 2022, she signed to join VfL Wolfsburg.

International career
Agrež has been capped for the Slovenia national team, appearing for the team during the 2019 FIFA Women's World Cup qualifying cycle.

International goals

References

External links
 
 
 

2000 births
Living people
Slovenian women's footballers
Slovenia women's international footballers
Women's association football defenders
1. FFC Turbine Potsdam players
Slovenian expatriate sportspeople in Germany
Expatriate women's footballers in Germany
ŽNK Mura players
ŽNK Radomlje players
VfL Wolfsburg (women) players
Frauen-Bundesliga players